The 2007–08 Alabama Crimson Tide men's basketball team (variously "Alabama", "UA", "Bama" or "The Tide") represented the University of Alabama in the 2007–08 college basketball season. The head coach was Mark Gottfried, who was in his tenth season as Alabama. The team played its home games at Coleman Coliseum in Tuscaloosa, Alabama and was a member of the Southeastern Conference. This was the 95th season of basketball in the school's history. The Crimson Tide finished the season 17–16, 5–11 in SEC play, lost in the quarterfinals of the 2008 SEC men's basketball tournament and were invited to the 2008 College Basketball Invitational but, decline the invitation.

Schedule and results

|-
!colspan=12 style=|Exhibition

|-
!colspan=12 style=|Non-conference regular season

|-
!colspan=12 style=|SEC regular season

|-
!colspan=12 style=| SEC tournament

See also
2008 NCAA Men's Division I Basketball Tournament
2007–08 NCAA Division I men's basketball season
2007–08 NCAA Division I men's basketball rankings

References

Alabama
Alabama Crimson Tide men's basketball seasons
2007 in sports in Alabama
Alabama Crimson Tide